The College of Physicians and Surgeons of Manitoba is a regulatory college which acts as a medical oversight body in Manitoba, Canada.  Its stated purpose is to "protect the public as consumers of medical care and promote the safe and ethical delivery of quality medical care by physicians in Manitoba".

Notes

External links
College Home Page

Medical and health organizations based in Manitoba
Professional associations based in Manitoba
Medical associations based in Canada
Manitoba